Martha Ratliff is an American linguist and Professor Emerita at Wayne State University. She is a leading specialist in Hmong–Mien languages and also notable for her reconstruction of Proto-Hmong–Mien.

Ratliff earned a B.A. in English from Carleton College in 1968, an M.A.T. in English Education from University of Chicago in 1970, and a Ph.D. in Linguistics from University of Chicago in 1986, with a dissertation entitled The Morphological Functions of Tone in White Hmong.

She currently serves as an associate editor for the historical linguistics journal Diachronica. She is co-founder of the Southeast Asian Linguistics Society along with Eric Schiller.

Publications
 
  Manuscript.
 
Newman, Paul and Martha Ratliff. 2001. Linguistic Fieldwork. Cambridge University Press.
 玛莎·拉特利夫 [Martha Ratliff] (2019). Miao Yao yuyan lishi yanjiu [苗瑶语言历史研究]. Beijing:‎ China Social Sciences Press.  (Chinese translation of Ratliff's 2010 book, Hmong-Mien language history)

References

External links
 Official faculty page

Linguists from the United States
Linguists of Southeast Asian languages
Year of birth missing (living people)
Living people
Wayne State University faculty
Linguists of Hmong–Mien languages
University of Chicago alumni
Women linguists
20th-century linguists
21st-century linguists
Historical linguists